John Neter is a German-born American statistician, university professor, and widely published author.

Growing up in Germany, he was a classmate of Henry Kissinger.

He spent much of his career teaching statistics at University of Georgia in Athens, Georgia.

In 1965 he was elected as a Fellow of the American Statistical Association.
He served as President of the American Statistical Association in 1985.

Bibliography
Michael H. Kutner, John Neter, Christopher J. Nachtsheim, William Li, Applied Linear Statistical Models, (McGraw-Hill College, January 2004)
Michael H. Kutner, John Neter, Christopher J. Nachtsheim, William Li, Applied Linear Regression Models, (McGraw-Hill College, May 2004)
John Neter, Student Solutions Manual for Use With Applied Linear Regression Models (3rd) and Applied Linear Statistical Model (4th), (McGraw-Hill College, December 1996)
John Neter, Michael H. Kutner, William Wasserman, Christopher J. Nachtscheim, Applied Linear Regression Models, (McGraw-Hill College, January 1996)
Michael H. Kutner, John Neter, Christopher J. Nachtsheim, Solutions Manual for Applied Linear Regression Models, (McGraw-Hill College, January 2003)
John Neter, G.A. Whitmore, William Wasserman, Applied Statistics, (Prentice Hall, February 1992)
John Neter, Michael H. Kutner, William Wasserman, Applied Linear Statistical Models: Regression, Analysis of Variance, and Experimental Designs, (McGraw-Hill, July 1990)
John Neter, James Loebbecke, Behavior of Major Statistical Estimators in Sampling Accounting Populations,  (American Institute of Certified Public Accountants, June 1975)

References

External links

 The Neter-Wasserman-Kutner Models Data
 Alpha Iota Delta Biography of fellow member John Neter

American statisticians
German emigrants to the United States
University of Georgia faculty
Living people
Fellows of the American Statistical Association
Presidents of the American Statistical Association
Mathematicians from Georgia (U.S. state)
Year of birth missing (living people)